Najan Ward is a British Indian actor, writer, film producer and record label owner.

Early life

Ward was born in Leicester, England to Hindhu, Gujarati parents. He studied acting at Brooksby Melton College . Before acting Ward had started a record shop called In The Groove in his home town of Loughborough. The shop came to a close with the decline of 12" vinyl sales, upon closure Ward started a house label called Lost My Dog Records with two friends he met from the shop.

Early work

Ward has had roles in Holby City, Home Time, Mobile, Green and See You at the Altar.

References

External links

English male television actors
1978 births
Living people
People from Leicester
Male actors from Leicestershire